Djupeskardnosi is a mountain in Ål municipality in Buskerud, Norway. It has an altitude of 1,711 meters above sea level and is the 699 highest mountain in Norway with prominence of at least 50 meters.

References

Mountains of Viken
Ål